Raffey Camomile Cassidy (born 12 November 2001) is an English actress. She first appeared as a child actress in the television movie Spanish Flu: The Forgotten Fallen (2009), adding her first brief film role in Dark Shadows (2012), her first main cast television role in 32 Brinkburn Street (2011) and main cast film role in Tomorrowland (2015), a dual role in Vox Lux (2018), and her first top billing in The Other Lamb (2019).

Early life
Raffey Camomile Cassidy was born on 12 November 2001 in Salford, England. Her father teaches acting and she grew up in a family where her siblings were also involved in the entertainment business. Cassidy took acting classes at David Johnson Drama in Manchester. Her first part came unexpectedly as she was accompanying her older brother Mossie on an audition for a role on a BBC drama. The casting crew needed a girl and, according to Cassidy, she "just happened to be there”.

Career
Cassidy's credits include Universal Pictures' Snow White and the Huntsman, opposite Charlize Theron, Kristen Stewart, and Chris Hemsworth, and Tim Burton's Dark Shadows, with Johnny Depp for Warner Bros. In 2015, Cassidy completed production as Molly in Amber Entertainment's Molly Moon and the Incredible Book of Hypnotism, with Emily Watson and Dominic Monaghan, and starred as the Audio-Animatronic Athena in Disney's Tomorrowland, with George Clooney, Hugh Laurie, and Britt Robertson.

On the television front, Cassidy co-starred in Mr. Selfridge, alongside Jeremy Piven.

In 2013 Cassidy was named to Screen International magazine's Stars of Tomorrow. At that time, she was the youngest actor ever to be featured on the annual list.

Cassidy is also featured in some short films, such as The Beast, Rust, and Miranda's Letter.

Filmography

Film

Television

References

External links

 
 

English television actresses
Living people
Actresses from Salford
English film actresses
English child actresses
English people of Irish descent
2001 births
21st-century English actresses
People from Worsley